The 2015 Uzbekistan Cup was the 23rd season of the annual Uzbek football Cup competition. The Cup draw was held on 12 February 2014 in Tashkent. Final match was played on 17 November 2015.

The competition started on 1 April 2015, and will end in November 2015  with the final to be held at the Pakhtakor Markaziy Stadium in Tashkent. Lokomotiv Tashkent, the defending Cup winner and 2014 Cup semifinalists, Pakhtakor, Bunyodkor, Nasaf Qarshi start in 1/8 final stage of the Cup.

The cup winner is guaranteed a place in the 2016 AFC Champions League.

Calendar

First round
First round matches were played on 1 April 2015 to define teams of Round of 32.

Bracket

Round of 32
The one leg matches will be played on April 28–29, 2015.

|}

Round of 16
The sixteen winners from the Round of 32 were drawn into eight two-legged ties.

|}

Quarterfinals
The first leg matches were played on 4 July (Metallurg Bekabad - Lokomotiv Tashkent, Pakhtakor-2 - Nasaf), 8 July (Pakhtakor - Semetchi Kuvasoy) and on 9 July (Sogdiana Jizzakh- Bunyodkor)
The second legs matches were played on 7 July (Lokomotiv - Metallurg Bekabad and Nasaf - Pakhtakor-2). The second legs matches Pakhtakor - Semetchi Kuvasoy and 
Bunyodkor - Sogdiana Jizzakh will be played on 28 July 2015.

|}

Semifinals
The first leg matches to be played on 11–12 August 2015. The second leg matches on 15–16 September 2015.

|}

Final

|}

References

Cup
Uzbekistan Cup
2015